Donald Angus Davison (October 26, 1892 – May 6, 1944) was a major general in the United States Army.

Biography
Davison was born on October 26, 1892, in San Carlos, Arizona, the second child of Lieutenant Colonel Lorenzo Paul Davison of Beaver Dam, Wisconsin and his first wife, Carolyn Lavina Shannon. He married Marjorie Risk, who died in 1986. Davison died on May 6, 1944, near Bangalore, India. He and Marjorie are buried at Arlington National Cemetery, along with his father.

Career

Davison graduated from the United States Military Academy in 1915, a member of "The class the stars fell on", that spawned 59 general officers out of a class of 164.  Graduating high in his class, he was commissioned into the United States Army Corps of Engineers.  In May 1941 he was sent to Britain to observe British wartime engineering and would become the Engineering Officer, US Army Forces British Isles in May 1942, within the Services of Supply, ETO.  Later Davison participated in the North African Campaign and the China Burma India Theater. Davison held the rank of brigadier general when he died suddenly in India on May 6, 1944. He was posthumously promoted to major general.

Davison Army Airfield is named for him.

References

External links
 Generals of World War II

People from Gila County, Arizona
United States Army generals of World War II
United States Army generals
United States Military Academy alumni
Burials at Arlington National Cemetery
1892 births
1944 deaths
Graduates of the United States Military Academy Class of 1915
United States Army personnel of World War I